The Central Bank of The Gambia is the central bank of The Gambia.  Its name is abbreviated to CBG. The bank is located in Banjul and was established in 1971. Buah Saidy is the current Governor.

Operations

As a central bank, CBG is responsible for providing banking services to the Gambian government, for managing interest rates and foreign exchange, for interacting with Gambian industries, for supporting microfinance, and for managing the value of the dalasi, which is The Gambia's currency.   The bank is responsible for managing the sale of Gambian bonds and treasury bills on the international securities market. The bank is involved in economic research in regard to the future of Gambia and West Africa.

The CBG is working with GIPFZA, the Gambia Investment Promotion and Free Zones Agency, in the creation of a 1.6 square kilometre business and industrial park near Banjul International Airport.

The CBG is the only institution in The Gambia that is permitted to issue the Gambian dalasi.

Governors of the Central Bank of The Gambia

Horace Reginald Monday, Mar 1971 - Nov 1972
Sheriff Saikuba Sisay, Dec 1972 - Apr 1982
Thomas Gregory George Senghore, May 1982 - Feb 1988
Mamour Malick Jagne, ? - 1991 - ?
Abdou A. B. Njie ? - 1994
Momodou Clarke Bajo, 1994 - 2003
Famara Jatta, 2003 - 2007
Momodou Bamba Saho, 2007 - 2010
Amadou Colley, 2010 - 2017
Bakary Jammeh, 2017 - 2020
Buah Saidy - since 1 October 2020

See also

Central banks and currencies of Africa
Economy of the Gambia
List of central banks

References

External links

Central Bank of The Gambia official site
GIPFZA
West African Monetary Institute
CBG's Banjul business park PDF dated October 2006

Gambia
Banks of the Gambia
Banjul
Gambian companies established in 1971
Banks established in 1971